R.E.D. (Rythmes Extrêmement Dangereux) is the sixth studio album by French singer M. Pokora.

Track list
"Intro R.E.D." (1:12)
"Avant nous" (3:13)
"Voir la nuit s'emballer" (4:02)
"Le monde" (3:14)
"Mieux que nous" (feat. Soprano) (4:24)
"Go Mama" (3:06)
"J'le fais quand même" (2:49)
"Wohoo" (3:21)
"Entre parenthèses" (3:20)
"Je te mentirais" (3:54)
"Ensemble" (3:08)
"On danse" (3:14)
"Cœur voyageur" (3:19)
"Ma jolie" (3:41)
"Le monde" (Acoustique) (3:25)

Charts

Weekly charts

Year-end charts

References

2015 albums
French-language albums
M. Pokora albums
Warner Music France albums